Andimba Toivo ya Toivo Airport  formerly known as Ondangwa Airport  is an airport serving Ondangwa, a town in the Oshana Region of Namibia.

The Ondangwa non-directional beacon (Ident: OA) is located on the field.

Airlines and destinations

The following airlines operate regular scheduled services at the airport:

See also
List of airports in Namibia
Transport in Namibia

References

External links
 
 
OpenStreetMap - Ondangwa
OurAirports - Ondangwa

Airports in Namibia
Buildings and structures in Oshana Region